Yurtbaşı is a village in the Posof District, Ardahan Province, Turkey. Its population is 31 (2021).

References

Villages in Posof District